Mikhail Blagosklonny is a scientist who studies cancer and aging. He is an adjunct faculty member at Roswell Park Comprehensive Cancer Center in Buffalo, New York.

Career
Blagosklonny earned both his M.D. in internal medicine and his PhD in experimental medicine and cardiology from the First Pavlov State Medical University of St. Petersburg. He was appointed associate professor of medicine at New York Medical College, Valhalla, NY in 2002 before taking a position as a senior scientist at Ordway Research Institute (Albany, New York). Blagosklonny held this position until 2009, when he was appointed professor of oncology at Roswell Park Comprehensive Cancer Center.

Blagosklonny's research interests include cancer and targeted cancer therapies that protect normal cells from damage, as well as the underlying mechanisms of aging (biogerontology) and anti-aging drugs. Roswell Park Comprehensive Cancer Center lists Blagosklonny as holding "Adjunct Faculty" and "Cell Stress Biology" positions with them.

Rapamycin and aging
Blagosklonny has formulated a hypothesis about the possible role of TOR signaling in aging and cancer and proposed using rapamycin, a popular cancer drug as a possible treatment for life extension. He advocates for rapamycin use in longevity research.

Editorial activities
Blagosklonny is editor-in-chief of Aging, Cell Cycle, and Oncotarget. In addition, he is associate editor of Cancer Biology & Therapy and a member of the editorial board of Cell Death & Differentiation.

The peer review process employed by Oncotarget has been criticized by Jeffrey Beall, a university librarian and expert on predatory open access publishing, who also included Oncotarget and Aging on his list of "potential, possible, or probable predatory scholarly open-access journals" in July 2015. Further reports on Beall's blog suggest that the substandard peer review processes for these journals are used by their respective editors-in-chief to entice prospective authors to include references to Blagosklonny's own publications in their articles (following the peer review), thereby raising his personal citation impact.

References

Living people
Russian medical researchers
Academic journal editors
Russian oncologists
New York Medical College faculty
Cancer researchers
Year of birth missing (living people)